João do Canto e Castro da Silva Antunes (19 May 1862, in Lisbon – 14 March 1934, in Lisbon), commonly known simply as João do Canto e Castro was a Portuguese Navy officer and the fifth president of Portugal during the First Portuguese Republic. He also briefly served as 67th prime minister of Portugal.

Early life
He was the son of General José Ricardo da Costa da Silva Antunes (Lisbon, 7 February 1831 – 7 August 1906) and wife (m. 1860) Maria da Conceição do Canto e Castro Mascarenhas Valdez (24 October 1825 – Lisbon, 20 April 1892).

In 1891 he married Mariana de Santo António Moreira Freire Correia Manoel Torres de Aboim (Lisbon, 13 June 1865 – 18 January 1946), sister of the 1st Viscount da Idanha and niece of the 1st Viscount de Vila Boim, and had issue.

Career
He occupied the post of Navy Minister, to which he had been appointed by Sidónio Pais, the "President-King" on 9 September 1918, and succeeded Pais after his murder on 14 December 1918.

During his rule there were two attempts to carry out a revolution. The first one, in Santarém, in December 1918, was led by the republicans Francisco da Cunha Leal and Álvaro Xavier de Castro. The second one was monarchist and was perpetrated in January 1919 and organized by Paiva Couceiro, who for some time managed to control the northern part of the country in what was called the Monarchy of the North. Although Canto e Castro was a monarchist, as President of the Republic he had to fight against a movement that defended his own ideals.

See also

 List of presidents of Portugal
 Portuguese First Republic
 History of Portugal
 Timeline of Portuguese history
 Politics of Portugal

References

1862 births
1934 deaths
Naval ministers of Portugal
People from Lisbon
Presidents of Portugal
Prime Ministers of Portugal
Portuguese admirals
Portuguese monarchists
19th-century Portuguese people
20th-century Portuguese politicians